The WPA Women's World Nine-ball Championship is an annual Pool tournament in the discipline of Nine-ball. The most successful player is Allison Fisher from England, who won the tournament in 1996, 1997, 1998 and 2001. The women's tournament usually takes place in a different place than the men's world championship.

Results

Winners

References

External links

World Pool-Billiard Association

Recurring sporting events established in 1990
Annual sporting events
Women's world championships